Adulting is a comedy podcast hosted by Michelle Buteau and Jordan Carlos and produced by WNYC Studios.

Background 
The show is a comedy podcast hosted by Michelle Buteau and Jordan Carlos and produced by WNYC Studios. The show explores what it means to grow up. The first episode debuted on May 21, 2019. The show released episodes on a weekly basis.

The show did a live event featuring Padma Lakshmi, Amber Ruffin and Dan Ahdoot in New York City at the Bell House on February 25, 2019. The show did an event at 92nd Street Y.

Format 
The show includes standup, advice, and interviews with guests. The show is always performed in front of a live audience. Each episode is about thirty to forty minutes long.

Reception 

The show was included on Oprah Daily, Marie Claire, Vulture, and Time as one of the best podcasts of 2019.

References

External links 
 

Comedy and humor podcasts
Audio podcasts
Interview podcasts
Advice podcasts
WNYC Studios programs
2019 podcast debuts